Deepak Prakash Baskota is a Nepalese politician. He is a former State Home Minister and executive chairman of the National Cooperative Federation of Nepal. Baskota has upheld the cooperative principle as part of the socialist agenda of Nepali Congress founder B. P. Koirala.

Baskota is the president of the Himalayan Orthodox Tea Producers Association and chairperson of the Tea Development Alliance. He is also an advisor to the National Cooperative Bank Ltd.

Baskota has contested the elections to the Pratinidhi Sabha national parliament in the Panchthar-1 constituency thrice. He won the seat in 1994, and came second in 1991 and 1999. He is also founder of cooperative movement in Nepal.

External links
Article on cooperatives

References

www.ncfnepal.com.np

Living people
Government ministers of Nepal
Year of birth missing (living people)
Nepal MPs 1994–1999